"Homecoming" is the sixth episode of the second season of the American television drama series Falling Skies, and the 16th overall episode of the series. It originally aired on TNT in the United States on July 15, 2012. It was written by Brian Oh and directed by Greg Beeman.

Plot
Hal stumbles across corpses of de-harnessed kids, among them Karen, alive. Tom and Anne grow closer. Weaver’s health deteriorates just as Tom discovers he may have been keeping important matters from the group in order to protect them.

Reception

Ratings
In its original American broadcast, "Homecoming" was seen by an estimated 3.61 million household viewers, according to Nielsen Media Research. "Homecoming" received a 1.2 rating among viewers between ages 18 and 49, meaning 1.2 percent of viewers in that age bracket watched the episode.

Reviews
Les Chappell of The A.V. Club awarded the episode with a score of B.

References

2012 American television episodes
Falling Skies (season 2) episodes